Phra Pok Klao Bridge is a bridge crossing the Chao Phraya River in Bangkok, Thailand. It serves to connect the two sides of the Chao Phraya River in the Bangkok area, namely Phra Nakhon District's Wang Burapha Phirom and Samphanthawong District's Chakkrawat with Khlong San District's Somdet Chao Phraya as well as Thonburi District's Wat Kanlaya.

History
Phra Pok Klao Bridge was built in 1982 on the 200th anniversary of Rattanakosin or Bangkok nowadays. The bridge was designed to alleviate traffic congestion on the adjacent Memorial Bridge. The bridge is composed of three viaducts, with the central viaduct designed to carry future mass transit links. The bridge was named after King Prajadhipok (Rama VII) since he was the builder of the nearby Memorial Bridge. 

In June 2020, the central viaduct that used to be the structure of the failed Lavalin Skytrain project will be converted into a sky park, and will be considered as the first sky park in Southeast Asia.

References

External links
 Pokklao Bridge Bureau of Maintenance and Traffic Safety, Thailand (link broken).

Road bridges in Bangkok
Bridges completed in 1984
Crossings of the Chao Phraya River